World Record is the 42nd studio album by Canadian-American singer-songwriter Neil Young and his 15th with Crazy Horse, released on November 18, 2022, through Reprise Records. The album was produced by Young and Rick Rubin, and preceded by the lead single "Love Earth".

Background and recording
World Records lyrical content concerns Young "reminisc[ing] with gratitude about the gifts the Earth has given him" as well as the "state of Earth" and "its uncertain future", as well as "Chevrolet", a song about "Young's relationship with cars". The album was recorded live and mixed to analog tape at Rick Rubin's Shangri-La studio in Malibu, California. It was completed in July 2022 with its release delayed to "properly release" the album in "quality" form on vinyl. Young also noted that the album is unlike 2021's Barn, and contains "unheard of combinations of instruments".

The album cover is a photograph of Young's father, the journalist Scott Young, with his date of birth printed next to it. Inside the album are pictures of his mother, brother, and sister with their dates of birth.

Release
The album was released on three-sided 2-LP to "optimize audio quality" with an etching on the remaining side, along with CD, cassette, and for streaming and download.

Critical reception

On review aggregator Metacritic, World Record has a score of 75 out of 100 based on seven critics' reviews, indicating "generally favorable" reception. Reviews from Mojo and Uncut noted the presence of background harmonies, keyboards and pump organ, which are uncharacteristic of Young and Crazy Horse's previous output. Fred Thomas of AllMusic also acclaimed Rubin's "muscular and often barnstorming production", which he found "lends itself unexpectedly well to the off-the-cuff recording method, pushing Young's vocals to the front of the mixes but making lots of space for the songs to breathe".

Michael Gallucci of Ultimate Classic Rock felt that while the album "doesn't go too deep" and "can be messy and often unfocused", "Young and Crazy Horse's allegiance to the material and themselves leads them to do what they've always done best: plugging in, following the leader and having a blast for 45 or so minutes". Reviewing the album for Exclaim!, Daniel Sylvester wrote that while "on paper [it is] a middle-of-the-pack Neil Young & Crazy Horse album", "it's filled with so much personality and passion that it begs to be remembered as one of his most soul-bearing".

Pat King of Paste opined that the songs on World Record "come off feeling like an unflinching and unfiltered plea for our dying planet. When they don't click, though, the songs just feel unsubtle and unpracticed in their performance and messaging". Writing for Under the Radar, Michael James Hall described the album as "a call to protest and a call to action delivered through a series of rough and tumble recordings", concluding that "even if [it] has neither the reach nor the presentation it might need to have a real impact, its heartfelt racket at least draws attention to itself and, consequently, to the action it begs us to take".

Track listing

Charts

References

2022 albums
Albums produced by Neil Young
Albums produced by Rick Rubin
Albums recorded at Shangri-La (recording studio)
Crazy Horse (band) albums
Neil Young albums
Reprise Records albums